Potoci  is a village in the City of Mostar, Bosnia and Herzegovina.

Demographics

2013
2,183 total
Bosniaks - 1,160 (53.1%)
Croats - 759 (34.8%)
Serbs - 226 (10.4%)
others - 38 (1.7%)

References

Populated places in Mostar
Villages in the Federation of Bosnia and Herzegovina